Maverick Mountain Ski Area is an alpine ski area located in the Beaverhead National Forest in southwestern Montana.

References

External links
 Official website

Buildings and structures in Beaverhead County, Montana
Ski areas and resorts in Montana
Tourist attractions in Beaverhead County, Montana